American Dreamer or American Dreamers may refer to:

Film and television
 American Dreamer (1984 film), an American film starring JoBeth Williams and Tom Conti
 American Dreamer (2018 film), an American film written and directed by Derrick Borte
 American Dreamer (2022 film), an American film starring Peter Dinklage
 American Dreamer (TV series), a 1990-1991 American television situation comedy
 "American Dreamer" (Supergirl), a season 4 episode of the TV series Supergirl
 "American Dreamers" (CSI: NY), a season 1 episode of the TV series CSI: NY

Music
 American Dreamer, a 2005 album by Brain Failure
 American Dreamers: Voices of Hope, Music of Freedom, a 2018 album by the John Daversa Big Band
American Dreamer (album), a 2021 box set of Laura Nyro reissued albums
 "American Dreamer", a song by Brooks & Dunn from their 2007 album Cowboy Town

See also
 American Dream (disambiguation)
 American Dreaming (disambiguation)